NVC community SD18 (Hippophae rhamnoides dune scrub) is one of the 16 sand-dune communities in the British National Vegetation Classification system.

It is the only community characterised in the NVC as "dune scrub".

It is a widely distributed coastal community. There are two subcommunities.

Community composition

The community has a single constant species, Sea Buckthorn (Hippophae rhamnoides), which is also regarded by the authors of British Plant Communities as a rare species.

Distribution

This community is found widely on the British east coast from Kent to Fife, but particularly in Norfolk and Lincolnshire; it is also found in a number of west coast localities, for example in Devon, Wales and Lancashire.

Subcommunities

There are two subcommunities:
 the Festuca rubra subcommunity
 the Urtica dioica - Arrhenatherum elatius subcommunity

References

 Rodwell, J. S. (2000) British Plant Communities Volume 5 - Maritime communities and vegetation of open habitats  (hardback),  (paperback)

SD18